The Fuzz Face is an effects pedal for electric guitar, used also by some electric bass players. It is designed to produce a distorted sound referred to as "fuzz", originally achieved through accident such as broken electrical components or damaged speakers.

History
Arbiter Electronics Ltd. first issued the Fuzz Face in 1966. Later units bear the "Dallas Arbiter", "Dallas Music Industries Ltd.", "CBS/Arbiter Ltd." or "Dunlop Manufacturing Inc." name.

The earliest units used germanium transistors. Silicon transistors were used in later editions of the pedal. Silicon transistors provided for a more stable operation, but have a different, harsher sound.

The electronics are contained in a circular-shaped metal housing. Ivor Arbiter "got the idea for the round shape when he one day saw a microphone stand with a cast iron base". The design was originally intended to be used as a microphone base for guitarists who sang. The pedal uses two knobs, one for volume, and one for the amount of distortion the pedal produces. The arrangement of controls and logo on the box suggests a face.

The circuit is based on the shunt-series-feedback amplifier topology - a standard in engineering textbooks. Sola Sound and Vox had been using the same circuit topology for their Tone Bender pedals earlier in 1966. The Fuzz Face is particularly similar to the Sola Sound unit known today as the "Mk1.5" Tone Bender. The main difference is that the Fuzz Face is biased slightly colder, making it more usable in warm environments. The original instructions even described the Fuzz Face as a "Tone-Bending" unit.

Dallas Music Industries made a final batch of Fuzz Face units in 1976 or 1977, shortly after moving to the United States. The company bought Crest Audio in the 1980s and although it was operating under that name when it reissued the Fuzz Face in 1986, the units still bore the Dallas-Arbiter name. They made about 2000 Fuzz Faces until 1990. In 1993 Dunlop Manufacturing took over production, making a variety of Fuzz Face units until this day. Several germanium and silicon models are available. In 2013 smaller versions with status LEDs and AC power jacks were introduced.

In the late 1990s Arbiter reissued the pedal as well.

Components

The circuit uses only a small number of components, plus a battery. Its sound is mostly dependent on the selection of transistors (type, hfe and leakage in case of germanium transistors). As germanium transistors are sensitive to temperature, the amount of leakage is variable. Thus the bias voltages will shift up and down, so the sound produced by a germanium Fuzz Face may change as the equipment heats up or cools down. Also, the battery is part of the circuit. Variances in voltage and internal resistance can make an audible difference.

According to Jimi Hendrix’s guitar tech Roger Mayer, Jimi would buy half a dozen Fuzz Faces and mark the one he liked best only to find out that he didn't like it in a different environment.

Despite popular belief that Arbiter used randomly selected pairs of transistors, Dennis Cornell, one of the engineers who worked for Arbiter in the 1960s, described in a 2016 Guitarist magazine article how he auditioned them for their sonic properties.

Early units used NKT275 germanium transistors. Later on, BC183L, BC183KA, BC130C, BC108C, BC209C and BC239C silicon transistors were used. The American made versions used BC109C transistors. Arbiter reissues used AC128s. Hendrix also switched to the silicon transistors, but they created additional difficulties on stage, since they are much more susceptible to receiving AM radio signals, which were then audible through the guitar amplifier.

Use

The Fuzz Face's continuing popularity and status as a classic may be explained by its many famous users, which include Jimi Hendrix, David Gilmour, Duane Allman, Stevie Ray Vaughan Pete Townshend, Eric Johnson and George Harrison.

The Fuzz Face has a low input impedance and thus is very sensitive to the guitar pickup. By rolling the volume knob, the guitar player can decrease the gain of the pedal and get a clean or crunch sound, while still having all the gain when the volume knob is on maximum. For the same reason, Fuzz Face pedals react differently when placed directly after the guitar than when after other pedals or after a buffer amplifier.

While some claim Wah-wah pedals are known to be troublesome with Fuzz Faces, artists such as Hendrix were known to use them together to spectacular effect.  His signal flow for live performance involved first plugging his guitar into a wah-wah pedal, then connecting the wah-wah pedal to a Fuzz Face, which was then linked to a Uni-Vibe, before connecting to a Marshall amplifier.

See also 

 Distortion (music)

References

External links
R.G. Keen: The Technology of the Fuzz Face
Fuzz Central: Arbiter Fuzz Face; Schematics

Effects units